Oliver Noonan (November 1, 1939 – August 19, 1969) was a free-lance photographer for The Boston Globe. He was taking photos of the Vietnam War for The Globe.

Death
On 12 August 1969, People's Army of Vietnam (PAVN) forces attacked a remote American fire base overlooking the Song Chang Valley some 30 miles south of Da Nang. In the battle that followed, a helicopter carrying a battalion commander and seven other persons including Noonan, went down with the loss of all on board. A major effort ensued to reach the site of the crash and to recover the bodies. Over five days of fighting, the 196th Infantry Brigade (Light) accounted for an estimated 524 PAVN killed while losing 34 of its own men.

The day he died he took exclusive photos of fierce fighting but the helicopter he flew in to get them to Da Nang was shot down. The film survived.

References

1939 births
1969 deaths